A tree sort is a sort algorithm that builds a binary search tree from the elements to be sorted, and then traverses the tree (in-order) so that the elements come out in sorted order. Its typical use is sorting elements online: after each insertion, the set of elements seen so far is available in sorted order.

Tree sort can be used as a one-time sort, but it is equivalent to quicksort as both recursively partition the elements based on a pivot, and since quicksort is in-place and has lower overhead, tree sort has few advantages over quicksort. It has better worst case complexity when a self-balancing tree is used, but even more overhead.

Efficiency 
Adding one item to a binary search tree is on average an  process (in big O notation). Adding n items is an  process, making tree sorting a 'fast sort' process. Adding an item to an unbalanced binary tree requires  time in the worst-case: When the tree resembles a linked list (degenerate tree). This results in a worst case of  time for this sorting algorithm.
This worst case occurs when the algorithm operates on an already sorted set, or one that is nearly sorted, reversed or nearly reversed. Expected  time can however be achieved by shuffling the array, but this does not help for equal items.

The worst-case behaviour can be improved by using a self-balancing binary search tree. Using such a tree, the algorithm has an  worst-case performance, thus being degree-optimal for a comparison sort. However, tree sort algorithms require separate memory to be allocated for the tree, as opposed to in-place algorithms such as quicksort or heapsort. On most common platforms, this means that heap memory has to be used, which is a significant performance hit when compared to quicksort and heapsort.

Example 
The following tree sort algorithm in pseudocode accepts a collection of comparable items and outputs the items in ascending order:

In a simple functional programming form, the algorithm (in Haskell) would look something like this:

 data Tree a = Leaf | Node (Tree a) a (Tree a)

 insert :: Ord a => a -> Tree a -> Tree a
 insert x Leaf = Node Leaf x Leaf
 insert x (Node t y s)
     | x <= y = Node (insert x t) y s
     | x > y  = Node t y (insert x s)

 flatten :: Tree a -> [a]
 flatten Leaf = []
 flatten (Node t x s) = flatten t ++ [x] ++ flatten s

 treesort :: Ord a => [a] -> [a]
 treesort = flatten . foldr insert Leaf

In the above implementation, both the insertion algorithm and the retrieval algorithm have  worst-case scenarios.

External links

 
 Tree Sort of a Linked List
 Tree Sort in C++

References

Sorting algorithms
Online sorts